Bigelow Mountain Preserve is a  state-owned nature preserve in the western part of the U.S. state of Maine. Located in the village of Stratton within Eustis, Franklin County, Maine, the preserve was created in 1976 in order to stop a proposed development of a ski resort in the area.

The namesake of both Bigelow Preserve and Mount Bigelow is Major Timothy Bigelow, a Revolutionary War patriot who climbed Mount Bigelow in October of 1775 "for the purpose of observation."

References

Protected areas of Franklin County, Maine
1976 establishments in Maine